Bullshit is a common expletive, meaning nonsense.

Bullshit may also refer to:

 Cow dung
 Bullshit (game), a card game
 Penn & Teller: Bullshit!, an American television series
 Bullsh*t the Game Show, a 2022 Netflix series
 Bullshit (G-Dragon song), a 2017 song by G-Dragon
 "Bullshit", a song by Dune Rats from their 2017 album The Kids Will Know It's Bullshit
 "Bullshit", a song by Grace Jones from her 1980 album Warm Leatherette
 "Bullshit", a song by Momus from his 2016 album Scobberlotchers

See also
 On Bullshit, an essay by Harry Frankfurt
 Bullshit bingo, also known as buzzword bingo
 Bullshit Detector, a series of albums by the band Crass